The AAW Heritage Championship (previously known as AAW Cruiserweight Championship) is a professional wrestling championship created and promoted by the American professional wrestling promotion All American Wrestling.

Title history
The inaugural champion was Dan Lawrence.
The current champion is Davey Vega, who is in his second reign. He defeated Ace Austin on September 1, 2022 on Destination Chicago in Chicago, IL.

Combined reigns

See also
AAW Heavyweight Championship
AAW Tag Team Championship
AAW Women's Championship

References

External links
AAW official website title history
  AAW Heritage Championship

Cruiserweight wrestling championships
AAW Wrestling championships